Pay the Rent may refer to:

Songs
 "Pay the Rent" (Green Apple Quick Step song), 1993
 "Pay the Rent" (Rammellzee song), 2004

Other uses
 Pay the Rent, an art installation by Australian artist Richard Bell
 Pay the Rent (movement), an Aboriginal Australian campaign led by Lidia Thorpe and others
 "Pay the Rent" (The Price Is Right), a segment game on the game show The Price Is Right

See also 
 Pay the Rent or Feed the Kids, book by Mel Hurtig
 Rent Money (disambiguation)